Lollipop Lust Kill was an American nu metal band, formed in 1996 in Toledo, Ohio.

Band history
Lollipop Lust Kill was formed in 1996 in Toledo, Ohio with the original line-up including DeadGreg, Dr. Distorto, Evvy Pedder, D. Human, and drummer Bloody Sunday. Prior to Evvy (Pedder's) 1996 induction into the fold, the band had resided under the moniker 'Candy Killers'. The name 'Lollipop Lust Kill' was derived partly from a desire by the original members to incorporate a sugar-coated, tongue-in-cheek feel to the band's name, with the 'lust kill' portion inspired randomly from a description of serial killer John Wayne Gacy in the Encyclopedia of Serial Killers as a 'lust killer' read aloud one evening by Pedder to the rest of the band. Lollipop Lust Kill was born. Bloody Sunday would be replaced by R. Cynic prior to the release of Motel Murder Madness with the departed drummer's brother Killer K. joining the band on keyboards during this time.

The band played their first show at the popular Toledo, Ohio haunt Frankies with a band named Toilet, which included future keyboardist Killer K. on guitar. They would continue to play in and around Toledo establishing a rabid and loyal fan base colloquially known as 'The Lollipop Guild'.

In 1998, Lollipop Lust Kill were finalists in Toledo WBUZ radio's "Buzz Band Showdown" earning them a spot on WBUZ's second local artist CD and opening a radio showcase concert, Buzzfest '98, with another Toledo-based band, Sugar Buzz. Performers included just-signed Kid Rock, Sevendust, Candlebox, Caroline's Spine, Fuel and Stabbing Westward.

In 2000, Lollipop Lust Kill self-released their full-length debut, Motel Murder Madness, which catapulted them into the top ten of MP3.com. Their major label debut, My So Called Knife, was produced by Sylvia Massy and recorded in her haunted studio in Weed, California. Massy is known for her work with Tool, System of a Down, Prince and Johnny Cash. The album featured a heavy rock re-make of Depeche Mode's song "Personal Jesus". It was released by Artemis Records in June 2002, but the album was met with lukewarm sales.

Prior to the release of My So Called Knife (a word-play on the show My So-Called Life), drummer R. Cynic and guitarist Dr. Distorto changed their stage names to Knits and Pill respectively.

In March 2004, guitarist DeadGreg and bassist D. human announced their departure from the band, citing personal reasons. Keyboardist Killer K. would follow suit a few weeks later. The band auditioned several potential replacement bassists before settling on Jay Jay and guitarist Brian Tilse, formerly of Rob Halford's outfit Fight. The reformed band attempted to write and record a follow-up to My So Called Knife for several months, before deciding to call it quits in June 2004. Jay Jay and Tilse proceeded to start the band Glass Pipe Suicide with Knits, and they recorded some demos which were made available for free online before disbanding sometime in 2005.

LLK played their final show at the popular Toledo venue Headliners on June 4, 2004. The original six members (those that comprised the band during the release of Motel Murder Madness) reunited for this farewell show to the accolades of several hundred friends and fans from around the country. Perhaps in a fitting final tribute, vocalist Evvy Pedder invited the audience onto the stage to participate in the traditional closing song "Balls Out" 'lollipop style'. In the mayhem that ensued, a portion of the stage collapsed: a fitting testament to the violent imagery forwarded by the band made manifest.

Guitarist Pill and vocalist Evvy Pedder attempted to resurrect the band with new members over the next several months, but to no avail.

The future of Lollipop Lust Kill remains in doubt. Pedder, the only remaining member, still harbors aspirations to bring their particular style of murderous musical mayhem to the masses as a solo artist. He did cut a few songs with Meegs from Coal Chamber under the project name Glass Piñata, but has not released anything since.

Notably, LLK toured with Coal Chamber, American Head Charge, Ministry, Motograter, Dog Fashion Disco and Kittie.

Three members (DeadGreg, Pill, and Knits) agreed to start a new band, called They Thought We Were Strangers, and played together for the first time since the farewell show in 2004. On January 27, 2011, the group released a 4-song EP available for download.

Genre
Their music is considered by many as alternative metal with rap metal and industrial metal influences. According to previous interviews, they consider themselves "murder rock".

Albums
 1997: Candycanes and Razorblades (EP)
 2000: Motel Murder Madness
 2002: My So Called Knife
 2005: Demo
 2009: Evvy Pedder

Members
 Stanley Bess - drums (1993-present)
 Larry Taylor - bass, backing vocals (1996-present)
 Brandon Howard - keyboards, turntables, samples, backing vocals (2000-present)
 Scott Black - vocals (2003-present)
 Savannah Green - guitar (2020-present)
Former:
 Ray Adams - guitar (1993-1995)
 Cassi Robb - bass (1993-1996)
 Russell Gates - vocals (1993-2003)
 Corey Ray - guitar (1995-2018)
Touring members:
 McKenzie Black - keyboards (2005)
 Dylan Campbell - guitar (2018-2020)
 Mike Thomas - bass (October 2022)

References

External links
Official MySpace site

American alternative metal musical groups
Musical groups established in 1996
Heavy metal musical groups from Ohio